The Hard Way is a 1980 made-for-TV action film directed by Michael Dryhurst and starring Patrick McGoohan, Lee Van Cleef and Edna O'Brien. A hitman (McGoohan) completes his final assassination and retires, but is then persuaded to take one final assignment.

Plot 
Professional hitman John Connor carries out his final assassination and then retires. Subsequently his handler McNeal wants him to perform one more execution, which he promises will be the final one. Connor insists he is retired and refuses to take the assignment, until coerced by McNeal, who threatens to harm his estranged wife. Connor appears to cooperate in the preparations for the hit, but suddenly aborts the mission and flees, taking with him the custom rifle engineered for the assassination. McNeal's men pursue Connor but he kills them. At the climax of the film, Connor confronts McNeal.

Cast

Production 
Co-writer Richard Ryan was the initial director, but was replaced early in production by Michael Dryhurst.

The film was made at The National Film Studios of Ireland (renamed Ardmore Studios in the early 1980s) in Bray, Ireland and on location. Connor's white cottage "Trapper" is on the Luggala Estate in Roundwood, County Wicklow. Kathleen delivers her monologue at St Kevin's Kitchen, Glendalough, County Wicklow. A collection of location stills and corresponding contemporary photographs is hosted at reelstreets.com.

Soundtrack 

 "Events in Dense Fog" and "Patrolling Wire Borders" (the latter incorrectly listed in the film's credits as "A Measured Room") from the album Music for Films by Brian Eno (EG Records, 1978).
 "The Dear Irish Boy" performed by Tommy Potts (solo violin) from the album The Liffey Banks (Claddagh Records, 1972).

Reception and releases 
In his book British Crime Film: Subverting the Social Order, critic Barry Forshaw writes: "Dryhurst’s paring down of narrative, dialogue and performance to a bare minimum pays dividends and the film has a cold, affectless sheen which commands attention". In the Radio Times, film critic David Parkinson awarded the film 2/5 stars, writing: "The scenery is breathtaking, but that scarcely compensates for the dour story and the lacklustre performances".

The film was included in the 2010 Edinburgh Film Festival "Retrospective: After the Wave" season, and was released on DVD by Network in 2009.

References

External links 

 The Hard Way at IMDb
 The Hard Way at AllMovie
 The Hard Way at BFI.

1980 television films
ITV (TV network) original programming
1980s English-language films